Ibrahim Rowther was an Veteran Indian film producer and writer who had worked on Tamil language films. He produced films under the studios Rowther Films, Tamilannai Cine Creation and IV Cine International.

Career
Ibrahim Rowther launched his first film, Uzhavan Magan in 1987 to promote his friend Vijayakanth as an actor in the Tamil film industry. Vijayakanth subsequently garnered several bigger offers, and regularly collaborated with Ibrahim during his acting career.

In the late 1990s, Ibrahim took up a key administrative role in the Tamil Film Producers Council and later served as its president. His production house, Rowther Films, began to flail in the late 1990s and films such as K.Paarthasarathy's Unakkum Enakkum Kalyanam featuring Livingston and Devayani were put on hold.

In 2000, Ibrahim Rowther announced five new films as a part of a comeback after the slowdown. He created a new banner known as Kamban Kalaikoodam, and planned to collaborate with directors he had already worked with. He announced films including Manobala's Naan Paada Ninaippathellam featuring Ramesh Aravind, Swarnamalya and Suhasini; Senthilnathan's Kadhal Mudal Kadhal Varai featuring Bala Kumaran and Uma; J. Panneer's Enakkoru Snehithi featuring Hamsavardhan and Rishi; A. R. Ramesh's Daddy featuring Raghuvaran; and R. Aravindraj's Pesum Vizhigal featuring Jaishankar's son Jaivijay. None of the films materialised owing to financial problems.

His last release was Puriyadha Anandam Puthithaga Arambam (2015) featuring Krish and Srushti Dange in the lead role. Rowther had selected Krish for the role in late 2012, but the film eventually went through a production delay and did not perform well at the box office.

Ibrahim often co-produced films with his wife, Tamil Fathima, for the studio Tamilannai Cine Creation.

Personal life
Ibrahim had a close relationship with his childhood friend, actor Vijayakanth. As his trusted confidante in the industry, Ibrahim was entrusted with the job of picking out the right scripts and producing films for the actor. However, the pair later fell out in 2012, with Rowther departing from Vijayakanth's political party to the All India Anna Dravida Munnetra Kazhagam citing that Vijayakanth lacked decorum.

Death
Vijayakanth often visited Rowther in hospital a week before his death, and wrote an open letter about their friendship.
Ibrahim Rowther died aged 64, following a prolonged illness on 22 July 2015.

Filmography

As producer
Rowther Films

Tamilannai Cine Creation

I. V. Cine Productions

References

External links

Film producers from Chennai
Tamil film producers
1950s births
2015 deaths
Year of birth uncertain